The 2023 OFC Champions League qualifying stage will be played from 18 to 24 February 2023. A total of four teams will compete in the qualifying stage to decide the last of the 8 places in the group stage of the 2023 OFC Champions League.

Preliminary group

Draw
The draw for the qualifying stage was held on 1 February 2023 at the OFC Headquarters in Auckland, New Zealand.

Format
The four teams in the qualifying stage played each other on a round-robin basis at a centralised venue. The winners will advance to the group stage to join the 7 direct entrants. The qualifying stage is hosted in Apia by Football Federation Samoa.
<noinclude>

Matches

National play-offs
On 10 February 2023, OFC announced that 7 sets of national playoffs would take place to determine which side from those nations would take part in this year's Champions League. 

|}
Suva won 3–2 on aggregate.

Tiga Sport won 5–1 on aggregate.

Auckland City won 6–4 on aggregate.

Hekari United won 4–1 on aggregate.

Solomon Warriors won 3–2 on aggregate.

Pirae won 9–3 on aggregate.

Ifira Black Bird won 4–0 on aggregate.

Notes

References

External links
OFC Champions League 2023, oceaniafootball.com

1
February 2023 sports events in Oceania
International association football competitions hosted by Samoa